Jacob Waldemar de la Rose (born 20 May 1995) is a Swedish professional ice hockey forward currently playing for HC Fribourg-Gottéron of the National League (NL). de la Rose was selected by the Montreal Canadiens in the second round, 34th overall, of the 2013 NHL Entry Draft. He previously played in the National Hockey League (NHL) for the Canadiens, Detroit Red Wings, and St. Louis Blues.

Since 2010, de la Rose has played for the Swedish national teams at the junior levels, winning silver medals at the 2012 IIHF World U18 Championships and the 2013 World Junior Ice Hockey Championships.

On March 19, 2019, de la Rose was sent to hospital with an accelerated heartbeat. It was the second time he'd suffered such an episode during the season. The previous event occurred during the 2018-19 NHL preseason while he was a member of the Montreal Canadiens. After the second episode, he was shut down for the remainder of the season and underwent a surgical procedure on his heart in April to correct the problem. He reported for training camp with the Red Wings in September 2019 - prepared to return to regular play.

Playing career
De la Rose was selected in the second round, 34th overall, at the 2013 NHL Entry Draft by the Montreal Canadiens. Montreal had acquired the draft pick as the result of a trade occurring on 27 February 2012 that sent Andrei Kostitsyn to the Nashville Predators in return for this pick and the cancellation of another fifth-round pick that they had previously given to Nashville in a trade involving Hal Gill ten days earlier, on 17 February. Before being drafted, De la Rose was the seventh-ranked European skater by the NHL Central Scouting Bureau's 2013 final draft scouting report; he was the tenth European picked.

In 2013's European Import Draft, which took place on 3 July, the Windsor Spitfires of the Ontario Hockey League (OHL) chose De la Rose 11th overall. Though Spitfires General Manager Warren Rychel believed that De la Rose would immediately make the transition to North American major junior hockey, he ended up remaining in Sweden to fulfill the last year of his contract with Leksands IF.

Professional
De la Rose played for Leksands IF from the 2011–12 season to the 2013–14 season. He played 87 games over that time, recording 25 points. He became — and remains — good friends with former Leksand teammate Filip Forsberg, who was also his two-time World Junior captain with Sweden.

In the 2014–15 season, de la Rose made the transition to North America and began his Canadiens career in the American Hockey League (AHL) with their affiliate, the Hamilton Bulldogs. He scored his first AHL goal on Joni Ortio in a 4–3 loss against the Adirondack Flames. De la Rose registered his first NHL point in his fifth NHL game on 12 February 2015, an assist on a Christian Thomas goal, which coincidentally happened to be his first NHL goal.

de la Rose began the 2018–19 season on the injury reserve list after suffering a cardiac episode following a pre-season game with the Canadiens. In his return to health, de la Rose was placed on waivers and claimed by the Detroit Red Wings on 17 October 2018. He scored his first goal as a Red Wing in a game against the Edmonton Oilers on 3 November 2018. He would go on to play 60 games with Detroit, scoring three goals and six assists. On 19 March 2019, de la Rose stayed overnight in a hospital after suffering a cardiac episode during a game against the New York Rangers. The following month, he underwent treatment to correct his accelerated heartbeat issue.

On 6 November 2019, de la Rose was traded to the St. Louis Blues in exchange for Robby Fabbri. He appeared in 34 games for the club, recording 6 points. On 10 September 2020, the Blues re-signed de la Rose to a one-year, $700,000 contract extension.

Following his seventh season in the NHL, de la Rose opted to return to Sweden as an impending unrestricted free agent, agreeing to a three-year contract with SHL club, Färjestad BK, on 1 June 2021.

After claiming the Swedish Championship in his first season with Färjestad BK, de la Rose opted to leave the SHL and join Swiss club HC Fribourg-Gottéron of the NL for the 2022–23 season on 9 March 2022.

International play

De la Rose represented the Swedish under-18 team, winning the silver medal during the 2012 IIHF World U18 Championships, held in Brno, Znojmo and Břeclav, Czech Republic. He also participated in the World U18 Championship the following year, 2013, held in Sochi, Russia, in which he captained the team to a fifth-place finish.

In addition to the 2013 U18 tournament, De la Rose participated in the 2013 World Junior Ice Hockey Championships earlier that year, held in Ufa, Russia. The following year, he played in the 2014 World Junior Ice Hockey Championships, held in his home country of Sweden, in Malmö. In both years, the Swedes captured the silver medal.

De la Rose then served as Sweden's captain during the 2015 World Junior Ice Hockey Championships held in Toronto and Montreal; Sweden finished in fourth place, failing to win a medal.

Personal life
De la Rose's father, Anders, is a retired ice hockey player and a former Swedish youth hockey coach. Playing from 1994 through 1996, Anders participated in 43 games and had 17 total points with the Arvika HC, formally of Sweden's Division 1 league.

De la Rose's older brother, Erik, is playing as a defenceman for Vítkovice Ridera of the Czech Extraliga. Jacob also has a sister, Matilda de la Rose.

Career statistics

Regular season and playoffs

International

Awards and honors

References

External links
 

1995 births
Living people
Detroit Red Wings players
Färjestad BK players
HC Fribourg-Gottéron players
Hamilton Bulldogs (AHL) players
Leksands IF players
Montreal Canadiens draft picks
Montreal Canadiens players
People from Arvika Municipality
St. John's IceCaps players
St. Louis Blues players
Swedish ice hockey centres
Ice hockey players at the 2022 Winter Olympics
Olympic ice hockey players of Sweden
Sportspeople from Värmland County